Children in Need 2017 was a campaign held in the United Kingdom to raise money for the charity Children in Need. It was the 38th Children in Need appeal show which was broadcast live on BBC One on the evening of Friday 17 November until the early hours of Saturday 18 November.

Greg James and Russell Kane didn't return for the 2017 telethon, and were replaced by Mel Giedroyc

Telethon
The culmination of Children in Need 2017 was broadcast on BBC One on 17 November from the BBC Elstree Centre. It was the longest Children In Need with the show running seven and half hours finishing at 03:00 making it the longest appeal show.

Presenters

Features
 Blue Peter does Strictly Come Dancing
 The Weakest Link Children in Need special
 EastEnders does the West End
 Doctor Who, Twice Upon a Time preview
 Countryfile Country & Western medley
 Hume's House Party

Totals

See also
 Children In Need

References

External links
 

2017 in British television
2017 in the United Kingdom
2017
November 2017 events in the United Kingdom